The Salisbury Plantation is a Southern plantation with a  historic house located in Woodville, Mississippi, USA. The one-story house was built circa 1811. It has been listed on the National Register of Historic Places since June 16, 1983.

References

Plantation houses in Mississippi
Houses in Wilkinson County, Mississippi
Houses completed in the 19th century
Houses on the National Register of Historic Places in Mississippi
National Register of Historic Places in Wilkinson County, Mississippi